Blowfly or blow fly may refer to:

 Calliphoridae, a family of flies
 Blowfly (musician) (1939–2016), also known by his real name Clarence Reid
 Blow Fly (novel), a 2003 Patricia Cornwell novel